The 1980 Virginia Tech Gobblers football team was an American football team that represented Virginia Tech as an independent during the 1980 NCAA Division I-A football season. In their third year under head coach Bill Dooley, the Gobblers compiled an overall record of 8–4 and lost to Miami (FL) at the Peach Bowl.

Schedule

Players
The following players were members of the 1980 football team.

References

Virginia Tech
Virginia Tech Hokies football seasons
Virginia Tech Gobblers football